Ted James (19 June 1889 – 23 January 1968) was an  Australian rules footballer who played with St Kilda in the Victorian Football League (VFL).

Notes

External links 

1889 births
1968 deaths
Australian rules footballers from Victoria (Australia)
St Kilda Football Club players